A Dozen Dead Roses is the second studio album by American post-punk band No Trend, released in 1985 through their very own No Trend Records. The album features a dramatic musical and stylistic shift from previous releases, being more funk influenced when compared to their previous noisy records such as Too Many Humans. The album features Lydia Lunch performing vocals on numerous tracks. The track "For the Fun of It All" originated from their previous release, Too Many Humans.

History
After the release of Too Many Humans, Frank Price and Michael Salkins left the group, leaving Jeff Mentges and Bob Strasser. Mentges would later recruit other musicians to help with the recording of A Dozen Dead Roses. This album features a dramatic change in sound, featuring influences of jazz and funk music. The sudden change in sound has been described as a prank on the fan base they've attained from the release of Too Many Humans. A Dozen Dead Roses is completely out of print, and the possibility of a reissue is unlikely due to the alleged destruction of the original master tapes, which was also thought to be true for Too Many Humans until the latter album was unexpectedly remastered and re-issued in 2020.

Track listing

Personnel

Performers
Jeff Mentges (as Jefferson Scott) - Vocals 
Lydia Lunch - Vocals (Tracks 2, 3, 8, and 10)
Danny "Spidako" Demetro - Keyboards
Bob Strasser (as Robert "Smokeman" Marymont) - Bass
Dean Evangelista - Guitar
Benard Demassy - Saxophone
Ken Rudd - Drums

Production
Don Zientara - Recording, Mixing
No Trend - Music, Recording
Dean Evangelista - Photography

References

1985 albums
No Trend albums